Giorgis is the name of:

Brian Giorgis (born 1955), American basketball coach
Lamberto Giorgis (1932–2019), Italian football player and manager
Fedele de Giorgis (1887–1964), Italian general
Giorgis Koutsourelis (1914–1994), composer

See also 
Giorgos